As of July 2016, the International Union for Conservation of Nature (IUCN) lists 395 extinct species, 206 possibly extinct species, 15 extinct in the wild species, 8 extinct subspecies, and 5 extinct in the wild subspecies of invertebrate.

Flatworms

Extinct species
Lake Pedder planarian (Romankenkius pedderensis)

Nemertea species

Extinct species
Geonemertes rodericana
Possibly extinct species
Prosadenoporus agricola

Annelids

Extinct species
Japan's earthworm (Amynthas japonicus)
Schmarda's earthworm (Tokea orthostichon)

Lake Pedder earthworm (Hypolimnus pedderensis)

Molluscs

Gastropods

Extinct species

Possibly extinct species

Extinct in the wild species

Extinct subspecies

Extinct in the wild subspecies

Bivalvia

Extinct species

Possibly extinct species

Extinct subspecies

Cnidaria

Possibly extinct species
Millepora boschmai
Wellington's solitary coral (Rhizopsammia wellingtoni)

Arthropods

Centipedes

Possibly extinct species
Mecistocephalus cyclops
Mecistocephalus sechellarum

Seed shrimps

Extinct species
Liocypris grandis
Namibcypris costata

Arachnids

Extinct species

Possibly extinct species

Millipedes

Extinct species

Possibly extinct species

Entognatha

Possibly extinct species
Ceratophysella sp. nov. 'HC'
Delamarephorura tami

Maxillopoda

Extinct species
Afrocyclops pauliani
Tropodiaptomus ctenopus

Malacostracans

Extinct species

Possibly extinct species

Extinct in the wild species
Socorro isopod (Thermosphaeroma thermophilum)

Insects

Extinct species

Possibly extinct species

Extinct in the wild species
Oahu deceptor bush cricket (Leptogryllus deceptor)

See also 
 List of least concern invertebrates
 List of near threatened invertebrates
 List of vulnerable invertebrates
 List of endangered invertebrates
 List of critically endangered invertebrates
 List of data deficient invertebrates

References 

Invertebrates
Recently extinct invertebrates